Major Culbert (born December 29, 1987) is a former American football linebacker. He first enrolled at the University of Nebraska–Lincoln before transferring to Abilene Christian University. He attended Narbonne High School in Harbor City, Los Angeles. Culbert has been a member of the Saskatchewan Roughriders and Toronto Argonauts of the Canadian Football League (CFL).

Early years
Culbert played high school football for the Narbonne High School Gauchos. He recorded more than 4,000 rushing yards and scored 37 touchdowns in his career. He rushed for 1,955 yards and 17 touchdowns his senior year. He also recorded 10 receptions for 123 yards his senior year. Culbert set a school record with 332 rushing yards. He also amassed 106 tackles, seven sacks and two interceptions.

College career
Culbert played college football from 2006 to 2008 with the Nebraska Cornhuskers of the University of Nebraska–Lincoln. He played running back and defensive back for the Cornhuskers before settling on defensive back in 2008.

He  transferred to play his senior year of college football for the Abilene Christian Wildcats of Abilene Christian University in 2009.

Professional career
Culbert was rated the 63rd best strong safety in the 2010 NFL Draft by NFLDraftScout.com.

He spent time playing for the Milan Demons of the Italian Football League.

Toronto Argonauts
Culbert signed with the Toronto Argonauts on May 10, 2013. He played in three games for the Argonauts in 2013, recording 13 defensive tackles. He was released by the Argonauts on November 18, 2013.

Saskatchewan Roughriders
Culbert was signed to the Saskatchewan Roughriders' practice roster on July 25, 2016. He was promoted to the active roster on July 28. He totaled 16 defensive tackles in four games for the Roughriders during the 2016 season. Culbert was released by the team on August 23, 2016.

Personal life
Culbert has spent time acting in Los Angeles since being released by the Argonauts.

References

External links
Just Sports Stats
College stats
realmajorculbert.com

Living people
1987 births
American football linebackers
American football running backs
American football defensive backs
Canadian football linebackers
Nebraska Cornhuskers football players
Abilene Christian Wildcats football players
Toronto Argonauts players
Saskatchewan Roughriders players
Players of American football from Los Angeles
People from Harbor City, Los Angeles
Players of Canadian football from Los Angeles